Heliopolis (Greek for "Sun City") may refer to:

Places
 Heliopolis (ancient Egypt), also known as Heliopolis in Augustamnica
 Heliopolis, Cairo, a suburb or district of Cairo, Egypt
 Heliopolis Sporting Club
 Heliopolis University in Cairo
 New Heliopolis
 Heliopolis (Lebanon), ancient city also known as Heliopolis Syriaca, Roman Heliopolis, or Heliopolis in Phoenicia; at modern Baalbek in Lebanon
Heliopolis (Athens suburb) or Ilioupoli, a suburb of Athens, Greece
Heliópolis, the largest favela of São Paulo City, Brazil
Heliópolis, Bahia, a municipality in Bahia, Brazil
Héliopolis, Algeria, a town and commune in Algeria
Héliopolis, a town in France situated on the Levant Island
Heliópolis, Seville, neighbourhood of the Bellavista-La Palmera district in Seville, Spain

Fictional places
Heliopolis (Marvel Comics), a location in Marvel comics
Heliopolis, a planet in the Stargate SG-1 episode "The Torment of Tantalus"

Literature
Heliopolis (Jünger novel), a 1949 novel by Ernst Jünger
Heliopolis (Scudamore novel), a 2009 novel by James Scudamore

Music
 "Heliopolis", a song by Agathodaimon from Phoenix 
 "Heliopolis", a song by Banco de Gaia from Maya
 "Heliopolis", a song by Samael from Reign of Light
 "Heliopolis", a song by Franz Schubert
 "Heliopolis", a song by Spyro Gyra from Morning Dance

Others
Heliopolis style, the architectural style of the modern Heliopolis Cairo suburb 
Heliopolis (2009 film), a 2009 musical docudrama film by Ahmad Abdalla
Héliopolis (2020 film), a 2020 Algerian film
Heliopolis (horse), a British thoroughbred racehorse

See also 
 Ennead of Heliopolis
 Heliopolitan Triad
 Heliopolitan gods in comics
 Sun City (disambiguation)
 City of the Sun (disambiguation)
 Helios (disambiguation)
 Helepolis